Pączkowo  is a village in the administrative district of Gmina Szreńsk, within Mława County, Masovian Voivodeship, in east-central Poland.

The village has a population of 170,000.

References

Villages in Mława County